Çeşme Museum is a general interest museum in Çeşme ilçe (district) of İzmir Province, Turkey.

Location
It lies at  within Çeşme Castle.

History
The castle was commissioned by Sultan Bayezid II of the Ottoman Empire in 1502. In 1965, the museum was established as a weapons museum, but high moisture caused some rusting in the metallic parts of the weapons and the weapons were transferred to other museums. Beginning in 1984, the museum was redesigned as a general purpose museum.

Exhibited items
In one hall items from the Archaic, Roman and Byzantine eras such as terracotta figurines, oil lamps and pottery are exhibited. One hall is reserved for objects from rescue excavations of Idırı (Erythrae) such as terracotta figurines, silver and copper coins and amphorae. Another hall commemorates the Battle of Çeşme, an 18th-century battle fought in the bay of Çeşme. In this hall maps, posters, flags, medals as well as objects from the sunken Russian flagship are exhibited.

References

Buildings and structures in İzmir Province
Çeşme
1984 establishments in Turkey
Archaeological museums in Turkey
Museums established in 1984
Tourist attractions in İzmir Province